Mondovi may refer to:

Mondovì, town in Italy, in the Piemonte
Battle of Mondovì, battle of the Napoleonic Wars
Roman Catholic Diocese of Mondovì, in the Ecclesiastical Region of Piedmont
Mondovi, Wisconsin, city in Buffalo County
Mondovi (town), Wisconsin, in Buffalo County
Mondovi, a former name of the town of Dréan in Algeria
Mondovi, Washington, unincorporated community in Lincoln County

See also
 Mondavi (disambiguation)